Shelley Smith (born October 25, 1952 in Princeton, New Jersey) is a former fashion model and actress. She first came to prominence as a fashion model, appearing on many magazine covers in the 1970s and early 1980s.  She then became an actress, primarily on television, working throughout the 1980s. She had two series The Associates and For Love and Honor, and made guest appearances on TV shows such as Murder, She Wrote, The Love Boat, and celebrity game shows in the 1980s, including Super Password, Pyramid, and Body Language.

She retired from acting and obtained a master's degree in psychology from Antioch University. In 1991, she founded the Egg Donor Program to help infertile couples.

References

External links
 

1952 births
Living people
Actresses from New Jersey
American television actresses
Female models from New Jersey
Antioch University alumni
People from Princeton, New Jersey
21st-century American women